Stefan Johansson (born 1956) is a Swedish racing driver.

Stefan Johansson may also refer to:

 Stefan Johansson (racewalker) (born 1967), Swedish race walker
 Stefan Johansson (ice hockey) (born 1988), Swedish ice hockey player
 Stefan Johansen (born 1991), Norwegian footballer
 Stefan Johannesson (born 1971), Swedish football referee